Nanhi Pari Seemant Engineering Institute (NPSEI) is an engineering college in Pithoragarh, Uttarakhand, India is one of the government engineering colleges of Uttarakhand. It was established in 2011, as a constituent institute of Uttarakhand Technical University. The college was established, financed by the government of Uttarakhand, and managed by Uttarakhand Technical University.

Nanhi Pari Seemant Institute of Technology, Pithoragarh (formerly known as Seemant Institute of Technology) is a constituent institute of Uttarakhand Technical University, Dehradun and is approved by UGC & AICTE. The institute runs five undergraduate programs in engineering. Construction work of the NPSIT campus is on its full swing. The institute provides its academic facilities to engineering students in its temporary campuses at GIC Pithoragarh government building.

Admissions 
Eligibility: 10+2 with 45% in Physics, Maths & Chemistry/Computer Science
 Duration: four years comprising eight semesters, full-time regular engineering degree.
Admission procedure: Seats are filled through 12th class merit merit based counseling conducted by the institute. Out of total seats, 90% are for Uttarakhand domiciles and 10% for All India students.

Student life

Athletics
Sports facilities include the volleyball court, cricket ground of the government school near by. Badminton court on outdoor ground.

Placements
Few companies come for placement due to its remote location. For placements, students usually travel to other institutes for pool placements.

Racing Teams

Sparks Racers Formula Student 
Team SPARK Racers is a group of engineering students in Nanhi Pari Seemant Engineering Institute Pithoragarh Uttarakhand under department of Electrical Engineering seeking out to build a Formula Three Race Car for the Formula Bharat, Formula Green & Formula Student competition.

Team Sankalp Racing 
Team Sankalp Racing is a team of Mechanical Department for building Go-Cart, Quad Bike for Racing. SANKALP is the Racing team of SAE INDIA Nanhi Pari Institute Pithoragarh collegiate club. The team will participate in Mahindra Baja, Maruti Suzuki Supra  &  Efficycle.

Research
Research activities are conducted at either the department level or under the central office of Sponsored Research and Industrial Consultancy (SRIC).

Undergraduate courses (B.Tech) 

Engineering colleges in Uttarakhand
Pithoragarh
Educational institutions established in 2011
2011 establishments in Uttarakhand